Swan Creek Township is one of the twelve townships of Fulton County, Ohio, United States. As of the 2010 census the population was 8,566, of whom 6,013 lived in the unincorporated portions of the township.

Geography
Located in the southeastern corner of the county, it borders the following townships:
Fulton Township - north
Swanton Township, Lucas County - east
Providence Township, Lucas County - southeast
Washington Township, Henry County - south
Liberty Township, Henry County - southwestern corner
York Township - west
Pike Township - northwestern corner

Much of the village of Swanton is located in northeastern Swan Creek Township, and part of the village of Delta is located in northwestern Swan Creek Township.

Name and history
It is the only Swan Creek Township statewide.

Government
The township is governed by a three-member board of trustees, who are elected in November of odd-numbered years to a four-year term beginning on the following January 1. Two are elected in the year after the presidential election and one is elected in the year before it. There is also an elected township fiscal officer, who serves a four-year term beginning on April 1 of the year after the election, which is held in November of the year before the presidential election. Vacancies in the fiscal officership or on the board of trustees are filled by the remaining trustees.

References

External links
County website

Townships in Fulton County, Ohio
Townships in Ohio